German submarine U-310 was a Type VIIC U-boat of Nazi Germany's Kriegsmarine during World War II. The submarine was laid down on 30 January 1942 at the Flender Werke yard at Lübeck as yard number 310, launched on 3 January 1943 and commissioned on 24 February under the command of Leutnant zur See Klaus Friedland.

During her career, the U-boat sailed on six combat patrols, sinking two ships, before she surrendered on 9 May 1945.

She was a member of seven wolfpacks.

Design
German Type VIIC submarines were preceded by the shorter Type VIIB submarines. U-310 had a displacement of  when at the surface and  while submerged. She had two shafts and two  propellers.

U-310 was fitted with five  torpedo tubes (four fitted at the bow and one at the stern), fourteen torpedoes, one  SK C/35 naval gun, 220 rounds, and two twin  C/30 anti-aircraft guns. The boat had a complement of between forty-four and sixty.

Service history
The boat's service life began with training with the 8th U-boat Flotilla in February 1943. She was then transferred to the 7th flotilla for operations on 1 August. She was reassigned to the 13th flotilla on 5 September 1944.

The boat made two short journeys from Kiel in Germany to Marvika and Egersund in Norway, between June and August 1944.

First patrol
The submarine's first patrol began with her departure from Egersund (south of Stavanger), on 13 September 1944. She moved up the Norwegian coast, arriving in Narvik on the 21st.

Second patrol
The boat torpedoed the Edward H. Crockett on 29 September 1944. She also sank the Samsuva in the same attack off the North Cape.

Third, fourth and fifth patrols
U-310s third sortie covered the Norwegian and Barents Seas.

In her fourth patrol, the U-boat rounded Bear Island and passed east of Murmansk.

Her fifth foray began in Harstad (northwest of Narvik), on 25 December 1944 and ended in Bogenbucht, (west of Narvik), on 5 January 1945.

Sixth patrol and fate
The U-boat's last patrol was relatively uneventful. She finished in Trondheim at war's end. There, she was broken up in March 1947.

Summary of raiding history

References

Bibliography

External links

German Type VIIC submarines
U-boats commissioned in 1943
World War II submarines of Germany
1943 ships
Ships built in Lübeck